The Dr. Joseph Halton House is a historic home in Sarasota, Florida. It is located at 308 Cocoanut Avenue. On March 22, 1984, it was added to the U.S. National Register of Historic Places.

References

External links

 Sarasota County listings at National Register of Historic Places
 Florida's Office of Cultural and Historical Programs
 Sarasota County listings
 Great Floridians of Sarasota

Houses on the National Register of Historic Places in Sarasota County, Florida
Houses in Sarasota, Florida
Queen Anne architecture in Florida
Houses completed in 1910